Morgan Lagravière (born 23 May 1987 in Réunion) is a French professional sailor who was a member of the National Olympic squad before progressing into offshore sailing.

Sailing background 
He comes from a dinghy sailing background from posium position the 420 Worlds he moved into the 49er class ending up as the reserve pair for the 2008 Summer Olympics together with Stéphane Christidis.

In 2014 he joined the Safran Sailing Team taking over from Marc Guillemot after 2014 Route du Rhum. Since 5 March 2015, he has been the skipper of the 60-foot IMOCA Safran II, the first IMOCA to be fitted with hydrofoils. With the assistance of Roland Jourdain, whose company Kairos manages the Safran project, he prepared to compete eighth edition of the 2016-2017 Vendée Globe on 6 November 2016. However, after 18 days of racing while in 4th place, he was forced to retire due to saffron damage sustained after hitting an unidentified floating object. After 12 years in the sport, Saffran pulled out of sailing sponsorship. He then tried to put together for the next Vendée Globe campaign, again with Roland Jourdain, but failed to secure the funding and ended up helping Isobel Joske IMOCA campaign. He got back into the figaro sailing and joined the Gitana team as a helm trimmer for there 2020/2021 Jules Verne record attempts.

Career highlights

Gallery

References

External links
 
 
 

1987 births
Living people
People from Réunion
French male sailors (sport)
420 class sailors
49er class sailors
Figaro class sailors
IMOCA 60 class sailors
French Vendee Globe sailors
2016 Vendee Globe sailors